Sidi Yaya Keita (born 20 March 1985) is a Malian former professional footballer who played as a defensive midfielder.

Club career
Born in Bamako, Keita moved to France at 18, signing for RC Strasbourg and spending his first year with the reserves, proceeding to be relatively used by the first team in the following two Ligue 1 seasons. He made his debut in the competition on 16 October 2004, playing 90 minutes in a 2–2 away draw against AC Ajaccio. While at Strasbourg Keita played as they won the 2005 Coupe de la Ligue Final.

Keita joined fellow league side RC Lens in the 2006–07 season, for €4.5m, as a replacement for Alou Diarra who joined Olympique Lyonnais. On 25 August 2007, he scored his first goal as a professional, in a 2–1 loss at former club Strasbourg, but the campaign eventually ended in relegation.

On 31 August 2009, Keita was loaned to Xerez CD in Spain, as the Andalusians were having their first La Liga experience. He made his first appearance on 27 September in a 0–0 away draw against RCD Espanyol, and quickly won the battle for first-choice holding midfielder over legendary club player Vicente Moreno, but they eventually dropped down a division.

After only eight league matches with Lens in 2010–11, with the club again being relegated, Keita was released by Les Sang et Or.

International career
Keita made his debut for the Mali national team on 3 September 2005, against the Democratic Republic of Congo. On 11 October 2008, he scored twice in a 2–1 home win against Chad for the 2010 FIFA World Cup qualifiers.

Personal life
Keita's cousin, Seydou Keita, was also a footballer and a midfielder. He too represented Lens and, with great individual and team success, also played for FC Barcelona.

He was the nephew of Salif Keita, who played for, amongst others, AS Saint-Étienne and Valencia CF.

Honours
Strasbourg
Coupe de la Ligue: 2004–05

Lens
Ligue 2: 2008–09
Coupe de la Ligue: runner-up 2007–08

References

External links
Racing Lens archives 

1985 births
Living people
Sportspeople from Bamako
Malian footballers
Association football midfielders
Mali international footballers
Djoliba AC players
Ligue 1 players
Ligue 2 players
RC Strasbourg Alsace players
RC Lens players
La Liga players
Segunda División players
Xerez CD footballers
Malian expatriate footballers
Malian expatriate sportspeople in France
Expatriate footballers in France
Malian expatriate sportspeople in Spain
Expatriate footballers in Spain
21st-century Malian people